Here I Am is a 2011 Australian drama film written and directed by Beck Cole.

Plot
The film tells the story of a young Aboriginal woman who has been recently released from prison, and wishes to turn her life around. She finds her way to a women's refuge, where she meets a number of other Aboriginal women, all escaping problems, who provide support as she tries to reconnect with her family, including her estranged mother, Lois, and her child, Rosie who is in the care of her grandmother.

Cast
The cast includes:
 Shai Pittman as Karen Burden
 Bruce Carter as Jeff
 Quinaiha Scott as Rosie
 Pauline Whyman as Skinny
 Marcia Langton as Lois, Karen's estranged mother
 Vanessa Worrall
 Betty Sumner
 Tanith Glynn-Maloney
 Carol Collins

Production
Here I Am, a drama, is Beck Cole's debut feature film as writer/director, and Shai Pittman's first acting role. The film was shot around Port Adelaide, with some scenes in Adelaide Women's Prison and almost all of the characters are Aboriginal Australians.

Warwick Thornton, former partner of Cole, was cinematographer, while Roland Gallois did the editing. The production company was Scarlett Pictures, with the main producer being Kath Shelper.

The music is by Cliff Bradley, with additional songs by the Yeah Yeah Yeahs, PJ Harvey and others.

Release
The film premiered at the 2011 Adelaide Film Festival on 26 February 2011, where it received a standing ovation by the audience. It was afterwards distributed by Madman, Footprint Films, and Transmission Films, shown in Australian cinemas from 2 June 2011.

It was shown on ABC Television on 8 December 2011 and later shown on SBS Television's streaming service.

Accolades
Screened in competition at the Montréal World Film Festival.
Nominated, International Feature award at the Adelaide Film Festival
Winner, Best Dramatic Feature, ImagineNative Film + Media Arts Festival

References

External links
 

2011 films
2011 drama films
Australian drama films
2011 directorial debut films
2010s English-language films
Films about Aboriginal Australians